Act:Lovesick is the first concert tour headlined by South Korean boy band Tomorrow X Together in support of their second full album The Chaos Chapter: Freeze and fourth extended play (EP) Minisode 2: Thursday's Child. The tour began on July 2, 2022 in Seoul, South Korea and concluded on October 28, 2022 in Manila, Philippines.

Background
On April 26 2022, TXT announced that they would embark on their first world tour. Tour dates in Japan and other Asian countries were unveiled on June 6 and June 21, respectively.

On July 1 2022, TXT released a trailer on YouTube along with a poster listing the dates for the tour and marking the start of the tour with it's first show at Jamsil Indoor Stadium in South Korea the next day.

Set list
The following set list is obtained from the July 2 show in Seoul. It is not intended to represent all dates throughout the tour.

 "0x1=Lovesong (I Know I Love You)"
 "Wishlist"
 "Blue Orangeade"
 "Magic"
 "Ghosting"
 "New Rules"
 "Puma"
 "What If I Had Been That Puma"
 "Loser=Lover"
 "Trust Fund Baby"
"Crown"
 "Magic Island"
 "9 and Three Quarters (Run Away)"
 "Blue Hour"
"Frost"
 "Maze In the Mirror"
 "Eternally"
 "Can't You See Me?" 
"Lonely Boy (The Tattoo On My Ring Finger)"
 "Anti-Romantic"
 "Good Boy Gone Bad"
Encore
  "Thursday's Child Has Far To Go"
 "MOA Diary (Dubaddu Wari Wari)"
 "Sweat"

Shows

References

External links
 
 

Tomorrow X Together
2022 concert tours
Concert tours of Asia
Concert tours of Indonesia
Concert tours of Japan
Concert tours of North America
Concert tours of South Korea
Concert tours of Thailand
Concert tours of the Philippines
Concert tours of the United States